Cladorhiza inversa is a species of sponge in the taxonomic class Demospongiae. The body of the sponge consists of a spicule and fibers and is water absorbent.

The scientific name of this species was first published in 1886 by Ridley & Dendy.

References

Cladorhizidae
Sponges described in 1886